Holt is an unincorporated community in Muhlenberg County, Kentucky, United States.

Holt was named for a businessperson in the coal mining industry.

References

Unincorporated communities in Muhlenberg County, Kentucky
Unincorporated communities in Kentucky